Zamostia is a commune (silrada) in Vyzhnytsia Raion, Chernivtsi Oblast, Ukraine. It belongs to Vashkivtsi urban hromada, one of the hromadas of Ukraine.

References

Villages in Vyzhnytsia Raion